Boletina is a genus of fungus gnats in the family Mycetophilidae. There are at least 30 described species in Boletina.

Species
B. abdominalis Adams, 1903
B. akpatokensis Edwards, 1933
B. antica Garrett, 1924
B. antoma Garrett, 1924
B. arctica Holmgren, 1872
B. birulai Lundstrom, 1915
B. crassicauda Van Duzee, 1928
B. delicata Johannsen, 1912
B. differens Garrett, 1924
B. gracilis Johannsen, 1912
B. groenlandica Staeger, 1845
B. hopkinsii (Coquillett, 1895)
B. imitator Johannsen, 1912
B. inops Coquillett, 1900
B. jucunda Garrett, 1924
B. longicornis Johannsen, 1912
B. magna Garrett, 1925
B. melancholica Johannsen, 1912
B. montana Garrett, 1924
B. nacta Johannsen, 1912
B. notescens Johannsen, 1912
B. obesula Johannsen, 1912
B. obscura Johannsen, 1912
B. oviducta (Garrett, 1924)
B. profectus Shaw and Fisher, 1952
B. punctus Garrett, 1925
B. sciarina Staeger, 1840
B. sedula Johannsen, 1912
B. shermani Garrett, 1924
B. sobria Johannsen, 1912
B. subatra Fisher, 1938
B. tricincta Loew, 1869
B. unusa Garrett, 1924

References

Further reading

 Arnett, Ross H. (2000). American Insects: A Handbook of the Insects of America North of Mexico. CRC Press.

External links

 Diptera.info
 NCBI Taxonomy Browser, Boletina

Mycetophilidae
Sciaroidea genera